Ian Morton Hannay (born 23 August 1935) is a British sailor who competed in the 1960 Summer Olympics and in the 1972 Summer Olympics.

References

1935 births
Living people
Sportspeople from Edinburgh
British male sailors (sport)
Olympic sailors of Great Britain
Sailors at the 1960 Summer Olympics – Dragon
Sailors at the 1972 Summer Olympics – Dragon